Mohamad Bazzi is a Lebanese-American  journalist. He is the former Middle East bureau chief at Newsday and a current faculty member of New York University. Bazzi was the 2007-2008 Edward R. Murrow Press Fellow at the Council on Foreign Relations. He is currently an adjunct senior fellow for Middle East Studies at the Council on Foreign Relations.

While at Newsday Bazzi covered the Middle East, Afghanistan, and Pakistan, where he focused on militant Islamic movements, regional politics, and the war on terrorism. He was Newsday's lead writer on the Iraq war and its aftermath. He also covered the 2000 Palestinian uprising, the 2001 war in Afghanistan, and the 2006 war between Hezbollah and Israel.

Biography
Mohamad Bazzi left his native Lebanon for the United States in 1985, when he was 10 years old. He began his journalism career in middle school writing for community newspapers in Queens. As a high school student he wrote more than 30 stories for New Youth Connections (now YCteen), New York's citywide magazine by and for teens published by Youth Communication. He became a United States citizen in 1994. He graduated magna cum laude in 1997 from CUNY. Bazzi was born in Beirut. He came to the U.S. with an older brother; another brother is in France, yet another is in Spain, and their parents and a sister remain in Lebanon. English is Bazzi's third language; he learned both Arabic and French as a child in Lebanon, and English after he came to the United States. Bazzi became a staff writer for Newsday in 1998.

In ten years on staff at Newsday, he was a metro reporter in New York City and served as the paper's United Nations bureau chief. His articles and commentaries on the Middle East have also appeared in The New York Times Magazine, The Nation, Newsweek, Christian Science Monitor, Chicago Tribune, Salon, Newark Star-Ledger, and The National (Abu Dhabi). Among Bazzi's awards are the 2008 Arthur Ross Award for distinguished reporting and analysis on foreign affairs; the 2008 American Academy of Religion Award for in-depth reporting on religion; the 2005 Elizabeth Neuffer Memorial Prize; the 2004 News Analysis Award from the NY Society of the Silurians; the 2004 James Aronson Award for social justice journalism; the 2003 Silver Medal from the United Nations Correspondents Association; and the 2002 Daniel Pearl Award for outstanding print reporting on South Asia.

Awards
 2008 Arthur Ross Award for distinguished reporting and analysis on foreign affairs from the American Academy of Diplomacy
 American Academy of Religion Award for in-depth reporting on religion
 2005 Elizabeth Neuffer Memorial Prize from the United Nations Correspondents Association
 James Aronson Award for social justice journalism from Hunter College
 2002 Daniel Pearl Award for outstanding print reporting on South Asia from the South Asian Journalists Association
 Young Reporter of the Year Award from the New York Press Club

References

External links
Column archive at The Nation

Mohamad Bazzi, Adjunct Senior Fellow for Middle Eastern Studies, Council on Foreign Relations
2008 Arthur Ross Award for Distinguished Reporting & Analysis of Foreign Affairs, The American Academy of Diplomacy
2009 CUNY Baccalaureate Commencement Keynote Speech: Mohamad Bazzi, CUNY

1975 births
American reporters and correspondents
Living people
American Shia Muslims
Lebanese Shia Muslims
Lebanese emigrants to the United States
City University of New York alumni
Hunter College alumni
New York University faculty
Journalists from New York City
Mohamad